List of conferences in London (chronological):

 London Conference of 1830 guaranteed the independence of Belgium
 London Conference of 1832 convened to establish a stable government in Greece
 London Conference of 1838–1839 preceded the Treaty of London (1839)
 London Conference of 1852
 London Conference of 1864 (25 April 1864 – 25 June 1864) establishing Armistice and negotiations about Peace in Second Schleswig War
 London Conference of 1866 the final in a series of conferences that led to Canadian Confederation
 London Conference of 1867 preceded the Treaty of London (1867)
 London Conference of 1881 French anarchist movement
 First Pan-African Conference (1900)
 2nd Congress of the Russian Social Democratic Labour Party (1903) Bolshevik-Menshevik split
 London Conference of 1908
 London Naval Conference 1908–1909
 London Conference of 1912–1913 also known as the London Peace Conference
 London Conference of 1914 was scheduled in August by London bankers and was supposed to avoid an escalation that led to World War I; conference never took place
 Conference of London (1920) discussion of the partitioning of the Ottoman Empire
  about German reparations
 Conference of London (1921–1922) dealing with the Treaty of Sèvres
 London Naval Conference 1930
 First London Naval Treaty (1930)
 Round Table Conferences (India) (1930). Followed by two further conferences in 1931 and 1932
 London Economic Conference (1933)
 London Naval Conference 1935
 Second London Naval Disarmament Conference (1935)
 Second London Naval Treaty (1936)
 London Conference (1939) on Palestine
 London Conference of 1945 set out the rules of procedure for the Nuremberg Trials; the official document which resulted was the London Charter of the International Military Tribunal
 London Conference of 1946–47 on the future of Palestine
 London 6-Power Conference (1948) post-WW-II conference of the Western Allies
 London Conference of 1948 concerning the United States Air Forces in Europe
 London Conference of 1954 one of two related conferences to determine the status of West Germany
 London Conference of 1959
 London Conference (1995)
 International Conference on Afghanistan (2006) 31 January 2006, the Government of Afghanistan presented its Interim National Development Strategy and launched the Afghanistan Compact
 International Conference on Afghanistan (2010) 28 January 2010: international conference trying to find a new Afghanistan Compact
 London Conference on Libya 29 March 2011
 London Conference on Somalia 23 February 2012
 London Conference on the Illegal Wildlife Trade 13 February 2014
 London Conference on Intelligence 2014-2017: private conference for research on human intelligence, including race and intelligence and eugenics. The conference was moved to Skanderborg, Denmark in 2018.
London Conference on the Illegal Wildlife Trade – 2018

See also

 London Agreement (disambiguation)
 London Declaration (disambiguation)
 London Protocol (disambiguation)
 Treaty of London (disambiguation)

References

 
International relations lists
Conferences in London
London-related lists
Politics of London